Halifax f.p. is an Australian television crime series produced by Nine Network from 1994 to 2002. The series stars Rebecca Gibney as Doctor Jane Halifax, a forensic psychiatrist investigating cases involving the mental state of suspects or victims. The series is set in Melbourne.

The producers of the film were Beyond Simpson Le Mesurier; Australian Film Finance Corporation and aired on the Nine Network Australia Pty Ltd. The budget for each episode was an average of AU$1.3 million. Funding came in part from the Australian Film Finance Corporation and Film Victoria.

The show was a set of 21 stand-alone television films, spread over six series. Each was between 90 and 120 minutes long, with a new "episode" airing roughly every few months during its eight-year run. The series aired in more than 60 countries. In August–October 2020, a short weekly revival of the series, called Halifax: Retribution, was also aired.

Background 
The series follows the career of Dr. Jane Halifax (Rebecca Gibney), a forensic psychiatrist. Her qualifications in the series are listed as MBBS (Melb.) and FRANZCP. Halifax is Melbourne-based and is shown living at Jensen House on Swanston Street opposite the State Library of Victoria. Her offices are shown as located in Causeway House on Little Collins Street. An only child, her mother, Angela Halifax, lives alone, and her deceased father, John Halifax (1935-1991), was a barrister who enjoyed magic as a hobby.

In episodes 1-7 and 9, she owns and drives a Jaguar Mark 2 (although she drives a modern convertible in episode 8 and later a Saab 900 NG). In episode 1, a book she wrote as an undergraduate (The Preppie Rapist) is mentioned in a court case where she appears as an expert. In episode 5, Halifax mentions returning from a stint in the US helping out the FBI. In episode 6, it is mentioned that she was 'burnt' by a relationship she had with a married professor while studying in the US. In episode 16, Halifax undergoes a colposcopy and a cone biopsy due do abnormal cell growth (a medical issue common in her father’s family).

Episodes 
Telemovies listed chronologically by series, with release dates by the Australian Television archive.

Series 1

Series 2 
Note: Episode 2 was aired after 3.

Series 3

Series 4 
Note: Episode 2 was aired after 3.

Series 5

Series 6

Reception 
The show went on to be nominated for and win a number of AFI awards.

AACTA Award for Best Telefeature, Mini Series or Short Run Series:
 1995 The Feeding (Winner); Hard Corps (Nominated); Lies of the Mind (Nominated)
 1996 Cradle and All (Nominated)
 1998 Afraid of the Dark (Nominated)
 1999 Swimming with Sharks (Nominated)
 2000 A Person of Interest (Nominated)
 2002 Takes Two (Nominated)

Best Actor in a Leading Role in a Television Drama:
 1995 (Hard Corps) Colin Friels & Steven Vidler (Winner); (The Feeding) Steve Bisley (Nominated); (Lies of the Mind) Richard Roxburgh (Nominated)
 1998 (Afraid of the Dark) Shane Connor (Nominated)
 1999 (Swimming with Sharks) David Tredinnick (Nominated)

Best Performance by an Actor in a Telefeature or Mini Series:
 2000 (A Person of Interest) Andy Anderson (Winner); (A Hate Worse Than Death) Nicholas Eadie (Nominated)

Best Actress in a Leading Role in a Television Drama:
 1995 (Lies of the Mind) Jacqueline McKenzie (Winner); (Lies of the Mind) Rebecca Gibney (Nominated)
 1998 (Afraid Of The Dark) Rebecca Gibney (Nominated)
 2002 (Takes Two) Mary Docker (Nominated)

Best Performance by an Actress in a Telefeature or Mini Series:
 2000 (The Spider And The Fly) Essie Davis (Nominated); (A Person Of Interest) Rebecca Gibney (Nominated)

Best Screenplay in a Television Drama:
 1995 Lies of the Mind (Nominated); The Feeding (Nominated)
 1998 Afraid of the Dark (Nominated)
 2000 A Person of Interest (Nominated)
 2002 Takes Two (Nominated)

Home media

See also 

 List of Australian television series

References

External links
 Australian Television archive
 
 List of Halifax f.p. episodes at epguides.com.
Halifax FP - "Afraid of the Dark" at Australian Screen Online

Nine Network original programming
1994 Australian television series debuts
2002 Australian television series endings
Television shows set in Victoria (Australia)
1990s Australian crime television series
2000s Australian crime television series
Television series by Beyond Television Productions